Lesley Cameron Locke (born 24 January 1934) was a Scottish footballer who played in the Football League for Queens Park Rangers and made guest appearances for Tottenham Hotspur. He remained an amateur after joining QPR, gaining three caps for the Scotland national amateur football team in addition to two he had collected while at Bromley.

References

1934 births
1990s deaths
Date of death missing
Scottish footballers
Queens Park Rangers F.C. players
Bromley F.C. players
Guildford City F.C. players
Association football inside forwards
English Football League players
Footballers from Perth, Scotland
Association football midfielders
Scotland amateur international footballers
Scottish emigrants to South Africa
Alumni of the University of London